Raja Bhuvan Mohan Roy (1876–1934) was the Chief of the Chakma Circle in the Chittagong Hill Tracts from 1897 until 1933.

Biography
He was born in 1876 to Raja Harish Chandra Rai Bahadur, Chief of the Chakma Circle. After the death of his father in 1885, the Court of Wards assumed the administration of the estate and the Chakma Circle, Bhuvan Mohan being a minor.

Bhuvan Mohan Roy was installed as Chief of the Chakma Circle on 7 May 1897, in recognition of which he received the personal title of Raja. In 1898, he established a Buddhist monastery, Sonaichari Rajvihar, at Sonaichari in what is now Rangunia Upazila. Dashabal Raj Bouddha Vihar was also established under his patronage. He attended the Delhi Durbar of December 1911.

James Philip Mills, an Indian Civil Service officer tasked in 1926–1927 with investigating how the Bengal Government could best use the Chittagong Hill Tracts Chiefs in the administration, wrote of him:

His son, Nalinaksha Roy, took over his duties from 16 July 1933. Bhuvan Mohan Roy died in 1934.

References

Chakma Royal Family
Chakma people
Buddhist monarchs
1876 births
1934 deaths
Place of birth missing